Kenneth Charles Holmes FRS (1934 – 2 November 2021) was a British molecular biologist.

He was born in Hammersmith, London. He was a former colleague of Rosalind Franklin at Birkbeck College with Aaron Klug and John Finch and moved to the Laboratory of Molecular Biology, Cambridge in 1962. From 1975 and 1976 he was acting Head of Outstation, EMBL Synchrotron Radiation Laboratory at DESY, Hamburg. He worked at the Max Planck Institute for Medical Research as an "Emeritus Scientific Member".

In 1981, he was elected a Fellow of the Royal Society, and was awarded their 1997 Gabor Medal which is of silver gilt and then accompanied by 1,000 pounds "in recognition of his achievements in molecular biology, in particular his pioneering analyses of biological structures and viruses, and his development of the use of synchrotron radiation for X-ray diffraction experiments, now a widely used technique not only in molecular biology but in physics and materials science".

He was awarded both the European Latsis Prize worth 100,000 Swiss Francs in 2000 based on his work on "Molecular Structure", and the Gregori Aminoff Prize of the Royal Swedish Academy of Sciences in 2001.

His scientific biography of Sir Aaron Klug, "Aaron Klug - A Long Way from Durban: A Biography" 
was published in 2017 by Cambridge University Press.
In 2021, he received the Lennart Philipson Award.

Holmes died on 2 November 2021, at the age of 86.

References

1934 births
2021 deaths
Academics of Birkbeck, University of London
Fellows of the Royal Society
British molecular biologists
People from Hammersmith
Scientists from London